Autumn Story is a 1980 children's book, the third of the four seasons of Jill Barklem's Brambly Hedge series. In it the mouse Little Primrose wanders off and finds herself in uncharted territory.

References

1980 children's books
British picture books
British children's books